Mimosa somnians, commonly known as dormideira, is a species of woody shrub in the genus Mimosa and the family Fabaceae. It is native to the Caribbean, Central America and South America. It is a short, low-lying shrub with minuscule thorns lining its stem-like hairs.

Mimosa somnians is notable for exhibiting rapid plant movement. Its leaves are sensitive to tactile stimulus, folding quickly when touched, similar to Mimosa pudica. It can be differentiated from Mimosa pudica in that its leaves are bipinnate, there are more than four subbranchlets and these originate from more than one point on the branch.

Mimosa somnians leaflets are 4–5 mm long. The flowers form pink balls. It propagates by seeds.

Forms, subspecies and varieties
Mimosa somnians f. viscida
Mimosa somnians subsp. longipes 
Mimosa somnians subsp. viscida
Mimosa somnians var. aquatica
Mimosa somnians var. deminuta
Mimosa somnians var. diminuta
Mimosa somnians var. glandulosa
Mimosa somnians var. lasiocarpa
Mimosa somnians var. leptocaulis
Mimosa somnians var. longipes
Mimosa somnians var. lupulina
Mimosa somnians var. possensis
Mimosa somnians var. somnians
Mimosa somnians var. velascoensis
Mimosa somnians var. viscida

Uses
In Guyana, it is used to calm down irritable children via washing.

Chemical constituents
Mimosa somnians contains (whole plant) about 0.029% tryptamine and about 0.029% methyltryptamine.

References

External links

Medicinal plants of South America
somnians
Taxa named by Aimé Bonpland
Taxa named by Alexander von Humboldt